The Taipei Metro Xinbeitou station (formerly transliterated as Hsin Peitou Station from 1997 until 2003) is the terminal station on the Xinbeitou branch line located in Beitou District, Taipei, Taiwan. The location of the station used to be the terminal station for the now-defunct TRA Xinbeitou Line.

Station overview

The two-level, elevated station features an island platform and two exits. The station is known for being the closest to the Beitou hot springs, such as Beitou Hot Spring Museum, Beitou Plum Garden, Ketaglan Culture Center, Beitou Hot Springs, Beitou Park and Sushi Express restaurant.

History
It reopened on 1937 after renovation. The station and the tracks form a unique "T" configuration. Later on, on 15 July 1988, the service was ceased with the discontinuation of Tamsui and Hsin Peitou Line.

Station layout

After termination of TRA services, the original station building was disassembled and moved to Changhua for display at the Taiwan Folk Village. On 1 April 2017, the station building was returned and re-opened at nearby Qixing Park in Beitou.

It was later reopened on 28 March 1997 with the opening of the Xinbeitou branch line.

There was a knife attack injuring 1 police officer on 29 March 2016.

Around the station
 Beitou Park

References

Tamsui–Xinyi line stations
Railway stations opened in 1916
Railway stations closed in 1988
Railway stations opened in 1997